St. Volodymyr Ukrainian Cemetery, marketed as West Oak Memorial Gardens, is a cemetery in Oakville, Ontario, established in 1984. According to the cemetery's website, it is operated by St. Volodymyr Cathedral.  The cemetery offers both in ground burial and burial vaults in perpetuity, and is open to all those of Christian faith.

14th Waffen Grenadier Division of the SS emblem controversy 

On 26 May 1988, Monument to the Glory of the UPA, a memorial to members of the Ukrainian Insurgent Army, was erected. Soon after, a cenotaph was erected, displaying the emblem of 14th Waffen Grenadier Division of the SS (1st Galician), and an inscription dedicating it "To Those Who Died For the Freedom of Ukraine".

On October 14, 2017, the Embassy of Russia in Ottawa's Twitter account posted images of the monuments, alongside a bust of Roman Shukhevych in Edmonton, with a caption referring to them as "monuments to Nazi collaborators." Alexandra Chyczij, vice president of the Ukrainian Canadian Congress, called these claims "long-disproven fabrications". John-Paul Himka, University of Alberta scholar who has researched this topic in depth, stated about these monuments, “The fact is the Ukrainian government and the diaspora have been honouring Holocaust perpetrators and war criminals for a long time.” Author Per Anders Rudling has also stated on the topic "Unfortunately, the Ukrainian-Canadian organizations have not shown real readiness to discuss these issues... On the whole there's a great deal of resistance".

Around June 21, 2020, the cenotaph was vandalized, with spray paint reading "Nazi war monument". Halton Regional Police Service initially reported that the vandalism was a "hate motivated offense", and refused to release images of the graffiti. Halton police later stated that the graffiti may have been targeting Ukrainians either as a whole or in the area, and that they did not "consider that the identifiable group targeted by the graffiti was Nazis."
In July 2020, Halton Regional Police released a statement saying that the message written on a controversial monument was no longer being considered a hate offence.
Oakville's mayor Rob Burton commented that the memorial was "repugnant" to him, but the contents of private cemeteries was out of his reach. Otherwise, he would have had it removed "years ago".

Notable burials 
 Gregory Hines – an American dancer, actor, choreographer, and singer.
 Negrita Jayde – was a Canadian female bodybuilding champion, and Author.
 Ulas Samchuk –  a writer, publicist, journalist, propagandist, Nazi collaborator, and antisemite.
 Roman Danylak – Canadian Ukrainian Catholic bishop.
 John Yaremko – first Ukrainian-Canadian to be elected to the Ontario legislature.

See also 
 Roman Shukhevych statue (Edmonton)
 List of Nazi monuments in Canada

References

External links 
 
 

Buildings and structures in Oakville, Ontario
Ukrainian-Canadian culture in Ontario
Cemeteries in Ontario
1984 establishments in Ontario
1984 establishments in Canada